Alan Roy Hector (26 October 1939 – 13 March 1986) was a South African cricketer. He played in 34 first-class and 2 List A matches between 1962/63 and 1970/71.

See also
 List of Eastern Province representative cricketers

References

External links
 

1939 births
1986 deaths
South African cricketers
Eastern Province cricketers
Gauteng cricketers
People from Springs, Gauteng